Ischitella is a town and comune in the province of Foggia, Apulia, southeast Italy.  It is a centre for agrumes production, on the northern slopes of the Gargano promontory.

Main sights
The castle, now a private palace, built in the 12th century and remade in the 17th century
Church of St. Eustace (18th century)
Abbey of San Pietro in Cuppis, located outside the town, in Byzantine-Romanesque style. Known since as early as 1058, it is now in decaying state.

Twin towns
  Settimo Torinese, Italy, since 2006

References

Cities and towns in Apulia